"No Particular Place to Go" is a song by Chuck Berry, released as a single by Chess Records in May 1964 and released on the album St. Louis to Liverpool in November 1964 (see 1964 in music).

"No Particular Place to Go" was recorded on March 25, 1964 in Chicago, Illinois and features the same music as Berry's earlier hit "School Days".

Lyrics
The song is a comical four verse story. In the first verse, the narrator is riding in his car as his girlfriend drives, and they kiss. In the second, they start to cuddle, and drive slow. In the third, they decide to park and take a walk, but are unable to release the seat belt. In the last verse, they drive home, defeated by said recalcitrant seat belt.

Recording 
The session(s) during which "No Particular Place to Go" was recorded were produced by Leonard and Phil Chess, and backing Berry were pianist Paul Williams, drummer Odie Payne, and bassist Louis Satterfield.

Charts

Cover versions
In 1982 George Thorogood & the Destroyers included a version on their album Bad To The Bone. In 1994 it also appeared on their live album Live: Let's Work Together.

References 

Chuck Berry songs
1964 singles
Chess Records singles
Songs written by Chuck Berry
Songs about cars
1964 songs